Mikkjel is a given name. Notable people with the name include:

Mikkjel Fønhus (1894–1973), Norwegian journalist, novelist, and short story writer
Mikkjel Hemmestveit (1863–1957), Norwegian-American Nordic skier

See also
Mikkel